Viva la Muerte (English: Long Live Death) is a 1971 internationally-produced drama film shot in Algeria, France, Spain, Italy, Portugal, Brazil, Philippines, Morocco and Tunisia and directed by Fernando Arrabal. The film was released on 12 May 1971 and Arrabal drew on his own childhood for inspiration for the movie. Viva la Muerte takes place at the end of the Spanish Civil War, telling the story of Fando, a young boy whose father was turned in to authorities as a suspected communist by his Falange-sympathizing mother. It has gained cult popularity as a midnight movie. The closing credits sequence features drawings by acclaimed artist, actor and novelist Roland Topor.

Synopsis
When Fando's fascist-sympathizing mother turns his father into the authorities as a suspected communist, Fando (Mahdi Chaouch) is told that his father was executed. In truth the father is actually just imprisoned and Fando eventually begins to search for him, constantly imagining what his father might be up to or what might have happened to him.

Cast
Anouk Ferjac as La Tante
Núria Espert as La Mère
Mahdi Chaouch as Fando
Ivan Henriques as Le Père
Jazia Klibi as Thérèse
Suzanne Comte as La Grand-mère
Jean-Louis Chassigneux as Le Grand-père
Mohamed Bellasoued as Colonel
Víctor García as Fando - 20 ans

Reception
Allmovie gave Viva la Muerte four stars, remarking that the film's extreme visuals would make it "not for the faint of heart". The New York Times gave the film a mostly positive review, stating that while it was "no perfect movie, it seems to me inescapably a major work."

References

External links

1971 films
1971 drama films
Films directed by Fernando Arrabal
Films set in Spain
Films shot in Tunisia
French avant-garde and experimental films
French drama films
1970s French-language films
French independent films
Spanish Civil War films
Roland Topor
1970s avant-garde and experimental films
Tunisian drama films
1971 independent films
1970s French films